Herbert Henry Smith (29 January 1871 – 25 November 1935) was an Australian politician.

He was born in St Kilda to architect Sydney William Smith and Sarah Ann Carter. He attended Alma Road Grammar School and became an importer, dealing mainly in bicycle parts and jewellery. He served on Melbourne City Council from 1913 to 1922, where he became known as an extreme conservative within the Nationalist Party. In 1921 he won a by-election for Melbourne Province in the Victorian Legislative Council. He served until his death at South Yarra in 1935.

Architect Sydney Wigham Smith (c. 1866 – 14 December 1933) was a brother.

References

1871 births
1935 deaths
Nationalist Party of Australia members of the Parliament of Victoria
United Australia Party members of the Parliament of Victoria
Members of the Victorian Legislative Council
People from St Kilda, Victoria
Politicians from Melbourne
Businesspeople from Melbourne